The Johns Hopkins University Applied Physics Laboratory (Applied Physics Laboratory, or APL) is a not-for-profit university-affiliated research center (UARC) in Howard County, Maryland. It is affiliated with Johns Hopkins University and employs 8,000 people (2022). The lab serves as a technical resource for the Department of Defense, NASA, and other government agencies. APL has developed numerous systems and technologies in the areas of air and missile defense, surface and undersea naval warfare, computer security, and space science and spacecraft construction. While APL provides research and engineering services to the government, it is not a traditional defense contractor, as it is a UARC and a division of Johns Hopkins University. APL is a scientific and engineering research and development division, rather than an academic division, of Johns Hopkins.

Hopkins' Whiting School of Engineering offers part-time graduate programs for Lab staff members through its Engineering for Professionals program. Courses are taught at seven locations in the Baltimore-Washington Metropolitan Area, including the APL Education Center.

History
APL was created in 1942 during World War II under the Office of Scientific Research and Development's Section T as part of the Government's effort to mobilize the nation's science and engineering expertise within its universities. Its founding director was Merle Anthony Tuve, who led Section T throughout the war. Section T was created on August 17, 1940. According to the official history of the Office of Scientific Research and Development, Scientists Against Time, APL was the name of Section T's main laboratory from 1942 onward, not the name of the organization overall. Section T's Applied Physics Laboratory succeeded in developing the variable-time proximity fuze that played a significant role in the Allied victory. In response to the fuze's success, the APL created the MK 57 gun director in 1944. Pleased with the APL's work, the Navy then tasked it with the mission to find a way to negate guided missile threats. From there on, the APL became very involved in wartime research. Expected to disband at the end of the war, APL instead became heavily involved in the development of guided missile technology for the Navy. At governmental request, the University continued to maintain the Laboratory as a public service.

APL was originally located in Silver Spring, Maryland in a used-car garage at the Wolfe Building at 8621 Georgia Avenue. APL began moving to Laurel in 1954, with the construction of a two million dollar building and a $700,000 wing expansion in 1956. The final staff transitioned to the new facility in 1975. Before moving to Laurel, APL also maintained the "Forest Grove Station," north of Silver Spring on Georgia Avenue near today's Forest Glen Metro, which included a hypersonic wind tunnel. The Forest Grove Station was vacated and torn down in 1963 and flight simulations were moved to Laurel. In the 1960s, APL built a mobile automaton called the Johns Hopkins Beast.

The Laboratory's name comes from its origins in World War II, but APL's major strengths are systems engineering and technology application. More than three-quarters of the staff are technical professionals, and 25% have computer science and math degrees. APL conducts programs in fundamental and applied research; exploratory and advanced development; test and evaluation; and systems engineering and integration.

Wartime contributions 
During the 1950s and the 1960s APL worked with the US Navy in the Operation Bumblebee Program on the Talos missile, Tartar missile, Terrier, and RIM-2 Terrier Surface to Air Missile systems. The follow-on RIM-50 Typhon Missile Project, based on improved Talos and Tartar Missiles, while successful, was cancelled in 1963 due to high costs and was eventually developed into the now well-known Aegis Combat System based on an improved Terrier.

In 1990, APL became involved with Operation Desert Storm and was involved in the  among other efforts. In the same decade (1992), APL, along with Johns Hopkins University, developed an algorithm that allowed for automatic mammogram analysis.

Pershing 
In 1965, the US Army contracted with APL to develop and implement a test and evaluation program for the Pershing missile systems. APL developed the Pershing Operational Test Program (OTP), provided technical support to the Pershing Operational Test Unit (POTU), identified problem areas and improved the performance and survivability of the Pershing systems.

Campus 
The modern Applied Physics Laboratory is located in Laurel, Maryland, and spans 453 acres with more than 30 buildings on site. Additional auxiliary campuses exist in the surrounding areas.

Education and internships 
APL is also home to a Johns Hopkins graduate program in engineering and applied sciences, called Engineering for Professionals. Courses are taught at seven locations in the Baltimore-Washington Metropolitan Area, including the APL Education Center.

The center is home to several popular internships for high school and college students, including the ASPIRE High School Intern program for high schoolers, as well as the College Summer Intern program, ATLAS Intern Program, and RISE@APL Intern Program for college students across the country.

Research
As of APL's 80th anniversary in 2022, there were hundreds of projects spanning the Lab's 12 mission areas, that focus on solving complex research, engineering and analytical problems that present critical challenges to the United States.  Projects span from those in APL's more traditional areas of work, including air and missile defense, undersea warfare, to newer projects such as homeland security, artificial intelligence and cyber operations.  APL has a list of 12 "Defining Innovations," which include the Lab's game-changing breakthroughs in technology that have created inflection points in history, including the Proximity fuze, Transit and Tomahawk.

Defense 
The U.S. Navy continues to be APL's primary long-term sponsor. The Laboratory performs work for the Missile Defense Agency, the Department of Homeland Security, intelligence agencies, the Defense Advanced Research Projects Agency (DARPA), and others. The Laboratory supports NASA through space science, spacecraft design and fabrication, and mission operations. APL has made significant contributions in the areas of air defense, strike and power projection, submarine security, antisubmarine warfare, strategic systems evaluation, command and control, distributed information and display systems, sensors, information processing, and space systems.

Space 

APL has built and operated many spacecraft, including the TRANSIT navigation system, Geosat, ACE, TIMED, CONTOUR, MESSENGER, Van Allen Probes, the New Horizons mission to Pluto, the Parker Solar Probe mission to the outer corona of the Sun, and STEREO.

In the early 1990s APL began building robotic space probes. It won the contract to build NEAR for one third the price that Jet Propulsion Laboratory (JPL), NASA's traditional supplier, estimated. APL's bid caused NASA to create the Discovery Program to solicit competing proposals for other missions. By the early 21st century Science described the two organizations as rivals. In 2019, the APL-proposed Dragonfly mission was selected as the fourth NASA New Frontiers mission. Dragonfly is a relocatable lander in an X8 octocopter configuration that will explore Saturn's moon Titan by flying between landing sites to move around the moon's surface. In November 2021, APL launched the Double Asteroid Redirection Test (or DART) mission, which struck the smaller body of a binary asteroid system in September of 2022; this is the first NASA planetary defense mission.

The asteroid 132524 APL was named in honor of APL after a flyby by the New Horizons spacecraft.

Prosthetics 
In 2014, APL made history with the successful use of the Modular Prosthetic Limb — a fully artificial articulated arm and hand — by a bilateral shoulder-level amputee. APL used pattern recognition algorithms to track which muscles were contracting and enable the prosthetics to move in conjunction with the amputee's body.

Similar technology was used in 2016 for a demonstration in which a paralyzed man was able to "fist-bump" Barack Obama using signals sent from an implanted brain chip. The limb returned sensory feedback from the arm to the wearer's brain.

Drones
The APL researches and produces unmanned aerial vehicles for the US military. One of its most recent projects is an unmanned aerial swarm that can be controlled by a single operator on the ground.

See also
List of United States college laboratories conducting basic defense research
Ralph Asher Alpher
Raquel Bono
Gwendolyn Boyd
Robert Braun
Anne Brennan
Robert Brode
Nancy Chabot
James Christy
Paul Dabbar
Richard Danzig
Brett Denevi
Lisa Disbrow
Andre Douglas
Ashutosh Dutta
Carlos Del Castillo
Christine Fox
Nicola Fox
David Goldfein
Michael Griffin
Lawrence Hafstad
Cecil Haney
J. Allen Hynek
Paul Kaminski
Christina Koch
Tom Krimigis
Ellen Lord
Ralph Lorenz
Victor McCrary
James Miller
Gordon Moore
George Murray
Heather Murren
Vivian O'Brien
Paul Oostburg Sanz
Louise Prockter
Gary Roughead
John Richardson
Michael Ryschkewitsch
Ralph Semmel
Ciara Sivels
Paul Spudis
James Stavridis
Paul Stockton
Rob Strain
Elizabeth Turtle
Merle Tuve
James Van Allen
Robert Work

References

External links
APL home page

Johns Hopkins University
Laurel, Maryland
Physics laboratories
University and college laboratories in the United States
Educational institutions established in 1942
1942 establishments in Maryland
Buildings and structures in Laurel, Maryland
Space technology research institutes